Cyclicthys is a genus of fish in the porcupinefish family, Diodontidae. Species in the genus are often known as swelltoads.

Distinguishing features
Fish of the genus Cyclicthys have three-rooted, rigid spines (actually modified scales) distributed over their bodies, and beak-like jaws, used to crush their hard-shelled prey (crustaceans and molluscs). They differ from members of the genus Diodon, which have moveable spines.

Defensive mechanisms
Like Tetraodontidae (blowfish) they have the ability to inflate themselves. Their inflated size combined with their spines make them extremely difficult to swallow. They may be poisonous, through the accumulation of tetrodotoxin or ciguatera.

Species
There are currently 3 recognized species in this genus:

References

Diodontidae
Marine fish genera
Taxa named by Johann Jakob Kaup